The Rwandan shaggy rat (Dasymys rwandae) is a species of shaggy marsh rat endemic to north-western Rwanda, close to the Virunga Mountains.

See also
List of mammals of Rwanda

References

Mammals described in 2003
Mammals of Rwanda
Dasymys